Shri Kamaxidevi Homoeopathic Medical College is the first and only homoeopathic medical college in Shiroda, Goa affiliated to Goa University and is recognized by Government of Goa. It is also recognized by the Central Council of Homoeopathy, New Delhi & Ministry of Health and Family Welfare, Dept. of AYUSH, Government of India.

Subhash Shirodkar, who worked as teacher for 16 years, served as a Member of the Legislative Assembly for many decades and a cabinet minister for Government of Goa, established the Shivgram Education Society at Shiroda in 1988 with a primary school, high school and a higher secondary school. He established Shri Kamaxidevi Homoeopathic Medical College at Shiroda in 1998.

The is attached to a teaching hospital for clinical training. Separate outpatient segments and inpatient department serves the public.

The college publishes the Indian Journal of Applied Homoeopathy, a quarterly publication, and is involved in various research activities. Many pioneering homoeopaths serve as visiting professors. The college also hosts seminars and exhibitions to popularize homoeopathy. The college's student council is involved in a variety of social activities.

The regulatory Central Council of Homoeopathy did not allow the college to admit first-year students in the 2021-2022 and 2022-2023 academic years due to the college’s failure to meet certain “norms.”

References 

Principal.Prof Dr.Roshini R Shirwaikar
Medical colleges in Goa
Education in North Goa district
Educational institutions established in 1998
1998 establishments in Goa